The Embassy of Colombia in London is the diplomatic mission of the Republic of Colombia in the United Kingdom. It is headed by the Ambassador of Colombia to the United Kingdom. It is located in the Knightsbridge district in a building it shares with the Embassy of Ecuador, near Harrods, Hyde Park, and Hans Place, precisely at 3 Hans Crescent at the intersection of Basil Street, and it is serviced by Knightsbridge station.

About
The embassy is charged with representing the interests of the President and Government of Colombia, improving diplomatic relations between Colombia and the accredited countries, promoting and improving the image and standing of Colombia in the accredited nations, promoting the Culture of Colombia, encouraging and facilitating tourism to and from Colombia, and ensuring the safety of Colombians abroad.

The structure that houses the embassy is a white stucco-fronted red-brick building. The embassy is a suite of rooms occupying part of the ground floor of the building, which has been described as an "apartment block".

Colombia also maintains a number of other buildings in the city: a consulate at 35 Portland Place, Marylebone, a Commercial Section at 2 Conduit Street, Mayfair and a Military, Naval & Police Attaché's Office at 83 Victoria Street, Victoria.

Colombian Ambassadors to the United Kingdom

1. 1943-1945:     Jaime Jaramillo Arango
2. 1945-1946:     Darío Echandía Olaya
3. 1948-1950:     Domingo Esguerra Plata
4. Unknown:       Rafael Sánchez Amaya
5. Unknown:
6. 1957:          Carlos Alberto Sardi Garcés
7. 1959:          Alfonso López Pumarejo
8. 1961-1962:     Virgilio Barco Vargas
9. 1965:          Alfredo Araújo Grau		
10. 1967-1970:    Víctor Mosquera Chaux
11. 1970-1972:    Camilo de Brigard Silva
12. 1973-1975:    Julio César Turbay Ayala
13. 1973-1977:    Alfredo Vásquez Carrizosa
14. 1977-1979:    Jaime García Parra
15. 1979-1981:    Gustavo Balcázar Monzón
16. Unknown:      Diego Andrés Restrepo Londoño
17. 1982-1985:    Augusto Espinosa Valderrama
18. Unknown:      Bernardo Ramírez Rodríguez
19. 1988-1990:    Fernando Cepeda Ulloa
20. 1990-1992:    Virgilio Barco Vargas
21. 1992-1994:    Luis Prieto Ocampo
22. 1994-1995:    Marta Noemí Santo Sanín Posada
23. 1995-1997:    Carlos Apolinar Lemos Simmonds
24. 1998-2000:    Humberto de la Calle Lombana
25. 2000-2002:    Víctor Guillermo Ricardo Piñeros
26. 2002-2006:    Alfonso López Caballero
27. 2006-2007:    Carlos Eduardo Medellín Becerra
28. 2007-2009:    Marta Noemí Santo Sanín Posada
29. 2010-2014:    José Mauricio Rodríguez Múnera
30. 2014-2019:    Néstor Osorio Londoño
31. 2019-2022:    Antonio Jose Ardila Gaviria
32. 2022:         Alvaro Gomez Jaramillo

See also
Colombia-Ireland relations
Colombia–United Kingdom relations

References

External links
 

London
Colombia
Colombia–United Kingdom relations
Buildings and structures in the Royal Borough of Kensington and Chelsea
Buildings and structures in the City of Westminster
Knightsbridge